Prophet River Hot Springs Provincial Park is a provincial park in British Columbia, Canada. Established high in the Muskwa Ranges, on the course of the Prophet River, it is part of the larger Muskwa-Kechika Management Area.

See also
Prophet River Wayside Provincial Park
List of hot springs
List of British Columbia provincial parks

References

External links

Provincial parks of British Columbia
Hot springs of British Columbia
Peace River Country
1999 establishments in British Columbia
Protected areas established in 1999